James Robert Kalsu (April 13, 1945 – July 21, 1970) was an American football player who was an All-American tackle at the University of Oklahoma and an eighth-round selection in the 1968 NFL/AFL draft by the Buffalo Bills of the American Football League. Kalsu joined the U.S. Army as an officer after the 1968 season and was killed in action in the Vietnam War in 1970.

Kalsu was one of two professional football players killed in the Vietnam War and the last to be killed serving as a soldier in a war until Pat Tillman in 2004.

Biography
James Robert Kalsu was born on 13 April 1945 in Oklahoma City, Oklahoma, and attended Del City High School. Kalsu was a starting guard for the Buffalo Bills in the 1968 season, playing the entire season and was the Bills' team rookie-of-the-year.

Following the 1968 season, to satisfy his Reserve Officers' Training Corps (ROTC) obligation, Kalsu entered the U.S. Army as a second lieutenant and arrived in South Vietnam in November 1969 as part of the 101st Airborne Division. On July 21, 1970, Kalsu was killed in action at the Battle of Fire Support Base Ripcord when his unit came under enemy 82-millimeter mortar fire while stationed near the A Shau Valley in Thua Thien Province. His family has declined to talk in detail about the circumstances surrounding his death.

When Kalsu had left for South Vietnam, Kalsu had to say goodbye to his wife, Jan, and his daughter Jill. On July 23, 1970, two days after his death, Jan gave birth to his son, James Robert Kalsu Jr, at the Kalsu home in Oklahoma City, and was informed that he had died only hours later. Kalsu was one of only two professional football players killed in action during the Vietnam War along with Don Steinbrunner, a former Cleveland Brown player who died on July 20, 1967. Kalsu and Steinbrunner were the first professional players to be killed in action since Al Blozis of the New York Football Giants died during World War II in 1945. Kalsu remained the last professional player to be killed in action until Pat Tillman died in the Afghanistan War in 2004.

Legacy
FOB Kalsu in Babil, Iraq, was founded and named after him by the 105th Military Police Company from Buffalo, New York, in early 2003. The name was chosen in a way to honor his sacrifice for his country and his connection to the Buffalo Bills. 
In 1999, NFL Films produced a feature on Kalsu that was nominated for an Emmy Award.
In 2000, the Buffalo Bills added Kalsu's name to the Buffalo Bills Wall of Fame.
In 2002, the replacement company at Fort Campbell was named in honor of him – 1LT J. Robert Kalsu Replacement Company.
Del City High School's football stadium bears his name.
 There is a CrossFit Work Out of the Day (WOD) named in his honor.
There is a post office in Del City, Oklahoma, named for Kalsu. The legislation was signed in law by President Barack Obama on November 5, 2015, and the post office was dedicated on November 5, 2016. The official name of the post office is the James Robert Kalsu Post Office, located at 4500 SE 28th Street in Del City, where Kalsu played high school football before enrolling at the University of Oklahoma.

Awards and decorations

See also

Elmer Gedeon and Harry O'Neill – the two Major League Baseball players killed in World War II.
Tim James – Basketball player who left his professional sports career and enlisted in the United States Army on September 12, 2008.

References

External links
NFL Films – Remembering Bob Kalsu
Kalsu's memorial on The Virtual Wall website
Benning soldiers adapt to new environment
Fort Campbell 1LT J. Robert Kalsu Replacement Company
Buffalo News story on Kalsu
Oklahoma Sooners football – All-American: Bob Kalsu
 
 Sports Illustrated – cover – July 23, 2001

1945 births
1970 deaths
Sportspeople from Oklahoma City
Players of American football from Oklahoma
American football offensive guards
Buffalo Bills players
Oklahoma Sooners football players
United States Army officers
American military personnel killed in the Vietnam War
American Football League players
United States Army personnel of the Vietnam War